Benjamin Hall (29 September 1778 – 31 July 1817) was an industrialist, politician and prominent figure in South Wales.

Background, education and connections 
Benjamin Hall was born on 29 September 1778, the eldest son of the Reverend Benjamin Hall, chancellor of the Diocese of Llandaff, and Elizabeth. He was educated at Westminster School and received a Queens Scholarship to study at Christ Church, Oxford in 1794, from where he graduated with a BA in 1799 and MA in 1801. He had joined Lincoln's Inn in 1798 and was called to the bar in 1801.

In December 1801, Hall married Charlotte, the daughter of ironmaster Richard Crawshay, in what historian P. A. Symonds calls an "advantageous marriage" - her dowry was £40,000. His father-in-law  made him a partner in the Cyfarthfa Ironworks in 1803 and in 1808 passed the Abercarn estate to him. This munificence was followed in 1810 with a bequest from his father-in-law of a 37.5 per cent share in the ironworks, which covered a significant amount of land and houses as well as the mine and quarry workings.

Member of Parliament 

Hall was the first industrialist to win a Welsh county seat in Parliament. He served as MP for Totnes from 1806 to 1812, for Westbury from 1812 to 1814, and for the Glamorganshire county seat from then until his death. He ended his association with Lincoln's Inn in 1816.

Family and heir 

Hall died on 31 July 1817 and a monument was erected in his memory at Llandaff Cathedral in his Glamorganshire constituency.<ref  He had bought Hensol Castle for £45,500 in 1815 to fulfil an election promise that he would own a residence in Glamorgan, some people having suggested that his personal loyalties lay with his business interests in neighbouring Monmouthshire. A year later, he sold his share in the ironworks to his brother-in-law, William Crawshay, for £90,000.

Hall and his wife had six sons and a daughter. One child was Benjamin Hall, 1st Baron Llanover, a civil engineer and politician who as Commissioner of Works was notable for the construction of the Clock Tower of the Palace of Westminster. Some hold that the bell is accordingly known as "Big Ben". Benjamin Hall senior had been called "Slender Ben" on account of his build.

Sir Benjamin Hall, a Welsh civil engineer  was First Commissioner of Works, and his name is inscribed on the bell hanging in the clock tower.------extract—From the Times--“All bells, we believe, are christened before they begin to toll,” “and on this occasion it is proposed to call our king of bells ‘Big Ben’ in honour of Sir Benjamin Hall, the president of the board of works, during whose tenure of office it was cast.”

References

External links 
 

 

 

1778 births
1817 deaths
Welsh industrialists
Members of the Parliament of the United Kingdom for Totnes
Members of the Parliament of the United Kingdom for Welsh constituencies
People educated at Westminster School, London
British ironmasters
UK MPs 1806–1807
UK MPs 1807–1812
UK MPs 1812–1818